See also Crawford Award for fantasy novels.
See also Max Crawford Medal Australian academic award.

The Crawford Medal is a vermeil medal awarded by the Royal Philatelic Society London for the most valuable and original contribution to the study and knowledge of philately published in book form during the relevant period.

The medal is named after James Lindsay, 26th Earl of Crawford, who by the time of his death in 1913 had amassed the greatest philatelic library of his time.

Other society medals
The society also awards these silver medals:

The Tilleard Medal for the best large display of any aspect of philately given by one, or not more than two, Fellows or Members during the relevant period.
The Lee Medal for the best paper dealing with any aspect of philately given by one Fellow or Member during the relevant period.
The Tapling Medal for the best paper written by a Fellow or Member and published in The London Philatelist during the relevant period.

List of winners of the Crawford Medal

See also
 Crawford Library
 List of philatelic awards

References and sources
References

Sources
The Society's medals and honorary fellowship. London: The Royal Philatelic Society London, 2009.

External links 
 The Royal Philatelic Society London

Philatelic awards
Awards established in 1920
Royal Philatelic Society London